William Greswell may refer to:

William Parr Greswell, clergyman and bibliographer
Bill Greswell, cricketer